Eric Joel Kresser (born February 6, 1973) is an American former college and professional football player who was a quarterback in the National Football League (NFL) and the Canadian Football League (CFL) for five seasons during the 1990s and early 2000s.  Kresser played college football for the University of Florida and Marshall University, and thereafter, he played professionally for the Cincinnati Bengals of the NFL and the Montreal Alouettes of the CFL.

Early years 
Kresser was born in Cincinnati, Ohio in 1973.  He attended Palm Beach Gardens High School in Palm Beach Gardens, Florida, where he lettered in high school football, basketball and baseball for the Palm Beach Gardens Gators.  Kresser received all-state honors in football.

College career 
Kresser accepted an athletic scholarship to attend the University of Florida in Gainesville, Florida, where he played for coach Steve Spurrier's Florida Gators football team from 1992 to 1995. Memorably, as a junior in 1995, Kresser threw for 458 yards and six touchdowns against the Northern Illinois Huskies, including a 96-yard touchdown pass to Gators wide receiver Jacquez Green.

After transferring to Marshall University for his senior year, Kresser became the starting quarterback for the 1996 Marshall Thundering Herd football team under coach Bob Pruett.  With future NFL hall of famer, wide receiver Randy Moss, as his primary target, Kresser threw for 35 touchdowns and over 3,400 yards, while winning the Southern Conference championship. Marshall defeated the Montana Grizzlies 49–29 in the 1996 NCAA Division I-AA Football Championship Game, and ended the season with a perfect 15–0 record.

Professional career 
Kresser signed a rookie contract with the Cincinnati Bengals, where he spent his entire three-year NFL career.

In 2000, the Bengals sent Kresser to play for the Berlin Thunder.  He started the first four games before injuring his right shoulder.

After sitting out the 2001 season, Kresser played for the Grey Cup champion Montreal Alouettes in the 2002 CFL season.

References 

1973 births
Living people
American football quarterbacks
American players of Canadian football
Berlin Thunder players
Canadian football quarterbacks
Cincinnati Bengals players
Florida Gators football players
Marshall Thundering Herd football players
Montreal Alouettes players
Players of American football from Cincinnati
Players of Canadian football from Cincinnati
People from Palm Beach Gardens, Florida
Tampa Bay Storm players